The Comeback Clan (Chinese: 翻叮一族; jyutping: faan1 ding1 jat1 zuk6; pinyin: fān dīng yī zú) is a 2010 Hong Kong TVB television drama starring Ha Yu, Benz Hui, Kiki Sheung, Christine Ng and Sammul Chan.

Produced by Kwan Wing-chung and co-edited by Choi Suk-yin, Yuen Siu-na, and Lee Yee-wah, the first episode premiered on 20 September 2010.

Synopsis
Tung (Ha Yu) saved the Lei family when they were in financial trouble.  However the daughters of the Lei family grew up thinking Tung caused them to go bankrupt.  They grew up in an unhappy childhood, while Tung appeared to walk off with their family's wealth.

Lei Yung-chi (Christine Ng) grows up and become a finance expert.  She plots a revenge and caused Tung to go bankrupt through his Mei Sik Yuen restaurant only to discover later he really was a savior.

Cast

Dai family

Yip family

Lei family

Ngai family

Mei Sik Yuen Restaurant

Chi Mei Chu Restaurant

Other casts

Viewership ratings

References

External links
TVB.com The Comeback Clan - Official Website 
K for TVB The Comeback Clan - English Synopsis 

TVB dramas
2010 Hong Kong television series debuts
2010 Hong Kong television series endings